For the 1997 Eurovision Song Contest held in Dublin, Ireland selected Marc Roberts to represent the country with the song "Mysterious Woman".

Before Eurovision

National final 
The final took place on 9 March 1997 at the Institute of Technology in Waterford, hosted by Pat Kenny. Eight entries competed in the final and the winner, "Mysterious Woman" performed by Marc Roberts, was determined by the votes of ten regional juries.

At Eurovision 
Roberts performed 5th in the running order on the night of the contest. "Mysterious Woman" went on to be placed 2nd with 157 points. To date, this was the last time Ireland's Eurovision entry placed in the top five.

Voting

References

1997
Countries in the Eurovision Song Contest 1997
Eurovision
Eurovision